Mike Mekash is an American make-up artist. He has won six Primetime Emmy Awards and has been nominated for eighteen more in the category Outstanding Makeup. In 2022 he won a Primetime Emmy Award for his work on the television program Stranger Things.

References

External links 

Living people
Year of birth missing (living people)
Place of birth missing (living people)
American make-up artists
Primetime Emmy Award winners